Hipnosis is the third studio album recorded by Mexican singer-songwriter Chetes released on May 11, 2010.

Track listing
This information adapted from Allmusic.

References

2010 albums
Spanish-language albums